Arhuaco, commonly known as Ikʉ, is an Indigenous American language of the Chibchan language family, spoken in South America by the Arhuaco people.

There are 8000 speakers, all in the Sierra Nevada de Santa Marta region of Colombia, 90% of whom are monolingual. Literacy is 1 to 5% in their native language. Some speak Spanish, and 15 to 25% are literate in that auxiliary language. The users have a very strong traditional culture and have vibrant use of their tongue. 

It is also known as: Aruaco, Bintuk, Bíntukua, Bintucua, Ica, Ijca, Ijka, Ika, and Ike.

The language uses a subject–object–verb (SOV) sentence structure.

Phonology

 is raised to and merged with  word finally.

This language registers 17 consonant phonemes:

Syllable structure 
With some exceptions, Arhuaco syllables may begin with up to two consonants (the second of which must be a glide /w j/) and may be closed by one of the following consonants: /ʔ n r w j/.

Prosody 
Arhuaco stress normally falls on penultimate syllables, with secondary stresses occurring on every other preceding syllable, in the case of longer words (e.g. /ˌunkəˈsia/ 'protective bracelet'). There are some affixes and enclitics that are extrametrical and do not count as syllables for stress assignment.

References 

Frank, Paul. 1985. A grammar of Ika. PhD thesis. University of Pennsylvania.

Frank, Paul. 2000. Ika syntax. Dallas, TX: Summer Institute of Linguistics.

Landaburu, Jon. 2000. La lengua Ika. in Lenguas indigenas de Colombia: Una visión descriptiva. Bogota: Instituto Caro y Cuervo.

Notes

External links
 Arhuaco (Ika) dictionary.
 Ika language version of the Faculty of Humanities of the National University of Colombia.

Languages of Colombia
Chibchan languages
Subject–object–verb languages